Tweets for My Sweet is a 2012 Philippine television situational comedy series broadcast by GMA Network. Directed by Uro dela Cruz, it stars Marian Rivera. It premiered on May 6, 2012. The series concluded on August 19, 2012 with a total 16 episodes.

Cast and characters

Lead cast
 Marian Rivera as Megan "Meg" Reyes

Supporting cast
 Barbie Forteza as Adele Reyes
 Sheena Halili as Lily Montecarlo
 Nova Villa as Anita Domina Berciles / Domina delos Santos
 Roderick Paulate as JB Mercado
 Elmo Magalona as Dino Mercado
 Boy Logro as Boy Reyes
 Mikey Bustos as Dexter Matibag

Recurring cast
 AJ Dee as Areil
 Alessandra de Rossi as London
 Kevin Santos as Inoy
 Betong Sumaya as Justin B.
 Ryzza Mae Dizon as Illuminada
 Glaiza de Castro as Kimberly
 Jean Garcia as Eleanor
 Mike Tan as Marco

Ratings
According to AGB Nielsen Philippines' Mega Manila household television ratings, the pilot episode of Tweets for My Sweet earned a 16.6% rating. While the final episode scored a 14.6% rating.

Accolades

References

External links
 

2012 Philippine television series debuts
2012 Philippine television series endings
Filipino-language television shows
GMA Network original programming
Philippine comedy television series
Philippine television sitcoms
Television series set in restaurants
Television shows set in the Philippines